The 3rd Michigan Infantry Regiment (Reorganized) was an infantry regiment that served in the Union Army during the American Civil War.

Service
The 3rd Michigan Infantry was organized at Adrian, Pontiac, and Grand Rapids, Michigan,  and mustered into Federal service between August 24, 1864, and October 12, 1864. The new regiment assumed the number of the original 3rd Michigan that had been discharged at the completion of their enlistment on June 10, 1864.

The regiment was mustered out on June 10, 1865.

Total strength and casualties
The regiment suffered 1 enlisted man who were killed in action or mortally wounded and 1 officers and 163 enlisted men who died of disease, for a total of 165 
fatalities.

Commanders
Colonel Moses Barrett Houghton

See also
3rd Michigan Volunteer Infantry Regiment
List of Michigan Civil War Units
Michigan in the American Civil War

Notes

References
The Civil War Archive

Units and formations of the Union Army from Michigan
1865 disestablishments in Michigan
1864 establishments in Michigan
Military units and formations established in 1864
Military units and formations disestablished in 1865